The Acanthocorini are a tribe of leaf-footed bugs, in the subfamily Coreinae erected by Amyot and Serville in 1843.  
Genera are distributed from Africa, South-East Asia through to Australia.

Genera 
The Coreoidea Species File lists:     
 Acanthocoris Amyot & Serville, 1843
 Antanambecoris Brailovsky, 2001
 Choerommatus Amyot & Serville, 1843
 Cordysceles Hsiao, 1963
 Murtula Schouteden, 1912
 Petalocnemis Stål, 1854
 Phelaus Stål, 1866
 Physomerus Burmeister, 1835
 Pluotenia Brailovsky, 2001
 Pomponatius Distant, 1904
 Postleniatus Brailovsky, 2007
 Rhyticoris Costa, 1863
 Turrana Distant, 1911

References

External links
 
 

Hemiptera tribes
Coreinae